The Battle of Dabarki, also known as the Battle of Dabarqi, was a military engagement fought between the Ethiopian Empire and the province of Egypt in 1848. The battle was a heavy defeat for the Ethiopians and would spur the modernization of the Ethiopian army.

History 
In the late 1840s, Abyssinian Emperor Tewodros II embarked on a campaign to consolidate his empire by invading Gonder, which he occupied in 1847. With his victory in the south secured, Tewodros decided strengthen his position by damaging his major rival, namely the Muslim power Egypt, then a nominal province of the Ottoman Empire. Invading through Ethiopia's western frontier, the Ethiopian army advanced into the Egyptian-controlled Sudan and occupied Metemma. 

In March 1848, Tewodros decided to attack Dabarki, a fortified post garrisoned with Egyptian and Ottoman troops. The Ethiopian attack faced heavy resistance and suffered heavy casualties from the Egyptian-Ottoman artillery. The attack failed and led to the collapse of Tewodros' campaign, forcing him and the Ethiopian army to retreat into the nearby highlands. 

The battle at Dabarki greatly effected Tewodros' military thinking, inspiriting him to modernize the Ethiopian army with more modern artillery and firearms. Several sources have described the battle as the first significant defeat in Tewodros' military career.

References 

1848 in Africa
1848 in Egypt
1848 in Ethiopia
Dabarki
Dabarki
Dabarki